Bahamas women's national softball team is the national team for Bahamas.  The team competed at the 1990 ISF Women's World Championship in Normal, Illinois where they finished with 4 wins and 5 losses. The team competed at the 1994 ISF Women's World Championship in St. John's, Newfoundland where they finished fourteenth.

References

External links 
 International Softball Federation

Softball
Women's national softball teams
Softball in the Bahamas
Women's sport in the Bahamas